Tyntchtykbek Kadyrmambetovich Tchoroev (Chorotegin) (is a Kyrgyz historian, publicist and journalist. President of the Kyrgyz History Society (elected on 11 February 2012), Doctor of History (1998), Professor of the Kyrgyz State National University named after Jusup Balasagyn (2002). Tchoroev is well known as an independent history researcher, Turkologist and journalist.  Until September 2011, he worked as a broadcaster at Radio Azattyk, i.e. Kyrgyz Service of Radio Free Europe/Radio Liberty (he was Director of the Kyrgyz Service between 1 January 2003 and 30 September 2010). He was chairman of the Board of the Muras (Heritage) Foundation under the Office of the President of the Kyrgyz Republic (between 30 August 2013 and 4 May 2017).

A short biography 
He was born in the village of Echki-Bashy in the On-Archa village area in Naryn district of Naryn region in Northern Kyrgyzstan on 28 March 1959. 
His grandfather Choro (Choro-Hajji) Aity uulu was a wealthy person, who made a pilgrimage to Mecca long before the 1916 anti-Tsarist uprising of the Kyrgyzstanis.

Choro-Hajji died in 1927, i.e. a little bit earlier than the launch of the extradition campaign for the rich Kyrgyz people by the Stalinist regime in the last years of the 1920s. Choro Hajji's mausoleum built in the 1927–28, still exists near the village of Echki-Bashy.
Bekbolot, Choro-Hajji's grandchild from his older son, died during the Stalinist purge, due to his connection with a wealthy family.

Choro-Hajji's wife, Suyumkan Malay kyzy, was a daughter of a wealthy person from a neighboring Ming-Bulak village. She was educated before the Soviet regime, that is why she could read the Koran in Arabic.

Kadyrmambet Tchoroev (or Choroev), the older son of Choro and Suyumkan, was married to his cousin, Aliya Kydyraaly kyzy, the daughter of Kydyraaly and Seidana Malay kyzy. 
Seidana was also a well-educated woman, who could read the Koran and write in Arabic script.

However, the Arabic script was officially banned in Kyrgyzstan in 1928–1929, when the Soviet Kyrgyz were transferred to the Latin script (until 1939–1940), and due to that the grand mothers of Tyntchtykbek were officially recognized as "uneducated" women.

Kadyrmambet and Aliya had five sons and three daughters. Tyntchtykbek is the fourth in the family.

In the early years, he was brought up by both Suyumkan and Seidana, the grand mothers from father's and mother's side.

Tyntchtykbek used to go to the summer-time pasture of Solton-Sary together with the family until the autumn of 1966.

The older brothers and his older sister helped him to learn ABC even before he started to go to a primary school.

He started to go to the Echki-Bashy village school in September 1966.

After finishing the 8th class in the village, he went to Naryn to study at the No 1 Toktogul Satylgan-uulu secondary school there.

He graduated the secondary school named after Toktogul Satylgan-uulu in the town of Naryn with a silver medal in 1976.

Then he became a student of the history faculty at the Kyrgyz State University (now - the Kyrgyz National University named after Jusup Balasagyn).

During his student time, he was actively participating in the scholarly and literature circles in the capital city of Frunze (nowadays Bishkek).

He graduated the university in Bishkek with the so-called "Red diploma" in 1981.

Education and scholarly background 
He graduated at the History Faculty of the Kyrgyz State University (now - the Kyrgyz National University) in Bishkek (then - Frunze), the capital of then Kyrgyz Soviet Socialist Republic in 1981. He studied in Tashkent at the Oriental Institute named after Abu Reihan Beruni of the Uzbekistan Academy of Sciences in 1983-1988 and defended his first doctoral thesis devoted to the Eastern Turkic groups' migrations in the 9th - 13th centuries according to the medieval Muslim sources (in Russian language; Tashkent, December 1988).

He led the Chair of the Ancient and Medieval History (1989–1991) and the Chair of the Asian and African States History (1992–1994) at the Kyrgyz National University. Then he studied for his doctorate at the same university (1994–1997) and defended his doctoral thesis devoted to the epoch and life of Mahmud al-Kashghari (al-Barsqani), the Eastern Turkic scholar lived in the 11th century, and his scientific legacy. It was defended at the Kyrgyzstan National Academy of Sciences on 10 April 1998 (in Kyrgyz language). His new monograph on the topic was published by the Muras Foundation in September 2017.

Textbooks and Turkology publications 
Tchoroev (Chorotegin) has published several monographs and books in Kyrgyz and Russian languages (since 1990) and several textbooks devoted to the ancient and medieval history of the Kyrgyz people and their neighbors in Central and Inner Asia.

The first post-Soviet Kyrgyz textbooks for the secondary schools in Kyrgyzstan by him in co-authorship with Professor Toktorbek Omurbekov have been translated from Kyrgyz into Russian and Uzbek languages.

The textbooks for the secondary schools are being officially distributed by the Education Ministry in Kyrgyzstan since 1996 until now (January 2013).

Some of his articles on Kyrgyz history and medieval sources were published by UNESCO, International Journal of Middle East Studies, Kyrgyz National Encyclopedia, Soviet Encyclopedia, etc. (in Kyrgyzstan, the United States, Western Europe, Russia, Turkey, China, Uzbekistan).

Public activities 

Tchoroev (Chorotegin) was a pioneer and a member of the Kyrgyzstan Komsomol during his childhood time as an ordinary child of his country, then a part of the Soviet Union.

At that time he was not aware that his father's elder brother was a victim of the Stalinist purge and died in an unknown part of Soviet Russia in a camp of the so-called Gulag. His view of the world was gradually changed in 1980–1988, especially during the Perestroika era.

In 1987–88, during the era of Perestroika in the U.S.S.R., he was one of the Kyrgyz intellectuals to fight for the equal statute of the Kyrgyz language with the official Russian language in his native republic.

In 1989, during the Perestroika epoch, he became one of the young Kyrgyz intellectuals to fight for a national identity of the Kyrgyz people. He was a founding member and one of the leaders of the Kyrgyzstan's Young Historians Association, the first nongovernmental organization of the Kyrgyz historians to challenge the official Soviet Kyrgyz historiography.
The Kyrgyz Soviet parliament adopted the Kyrgyz State Language Law on 23 September 1989, which allowed the Kyrgyz people in the republic to take the surname making suffix '-tegin' instead of the Russian-language suffix '-ov' / '-ev'. Shortly after the law has been implemented, Dr. Tchoroev started to use the literature name "Chorotegin". Thus, most of his post-Soviet works were published under the surname of Chorotegin.

First, he was deputy chairman, then the chairman of the Kyrgyzstan's Young Historians Association which was established despite the obstacles from then Communist leadership in Kyrgyzstan, on 3 June 1989. It was the first nongovernmental organization to hold its founding conference in the Kyrgyz language with a simultaneous Russian translation.

The Kyrgyzstan Writers Union, led by a prominent writer and statesman Chingiz Aitmatov, supported the young Kyrgyz historians by allowing them to hold their conference in the Union's hall (free of charge).

He was the co-author of the new program of the Kyrgyz history for the secondary schools published in September 1989 in both Kyrgyz and Russian languages in the Mugalimder Gazetasy (The Teachers' Newspaper), the official media outlet of the Kyrgyz Education Ministry, where the previous Kyrgyz historiography views were challenged by the new ideas.

He was elected as a member of the Board of the Kyrgyz Republic's Public Radio and TV Broadcasting Company (KTRK) by the Kyrgyzstan Parliament on 18 April 2012 and worked until the end of the term (April 2017.)

He became a member of the Official commission for development of the history science under Kyrgyz President (the decree was signed by the Kyrgyz President Almazbek Atambayev on 25 April 2012.)

Political activities 
In 1990 January and February, Tchoroev (Chorotegin) participated at the protest rally of the democracy-oriented Kyrgyz youth in Bishkek. Then he was one of the main organizers of the round tables with participation of the young Kyrgyz scholars, students and young workers and the Kyrgyz Soviet officials (February – April 1990).

In April, Tchoroev (Chorotegin) became a member of the underground political party of Asaba (Flag), and participated at the first ever anti-Communist rally organized by the party on 1 May 1990 in Bishkek. The columns of the rally participants followed by the officially allowed Communist-run columns through the Central Ala-Too square in Bishkek.

The difference of the Asaba Party's column was in their slogans written on the blue placards demanding to build democracy and to stop the one-party-ruling system in Soviet Kyrgyzstan.

Tchoroev (Chorotegin) was one of the organizers of the Democratic Movement of Kyrgyzstan (Kyrgyzstan Demokratialyk Kyimyly, KDK), the first umbrella bloc for several opposition parties, movements and nongovernmental organizations in Kyrgyzstan (1990 - 1993). (See: Democratic Movement of Kyrgyzstan.)

The founding Congress of the KDK was held in Bishkek on 25–26 May 1990. At the Congress, he presented a report on the Regulations of the KDK (he was the author of the draft of the Regulations. The core ideas of the KDK's Regulations were based upon similar documents of the anti-Communist democratic movements of the Baltic states).

In October 1990, he participated at the international conference of the anti-Communist organizations from several Soviet republics, including some separatist republics, in Kiev. He witnessed the anti-Communist hunger strike of the Ukrainian students there.

In 19–27 October 1990, Tchoroev (Chorotegin) also was amongst organizers and active participants of the similar hunger strike action in Frunze (nowadays Bishkek), the capital city of Kyrgyzstan, organized by the KDK.

The protest action with demands to democratize then the Soviet Central Asian republic, ended with the victory of the democracy-oriented politicians: Askar Akayev, a Kyrgyz academician who started to criticize the ruling Communist regime, was elected by the parliament as the first ever Kyrgyzstan President.

In 1992, he was one of the co-authors of the alternate draft of the post-Soviet Kyrgyzstan Constitution (published in both Kyrgyz and Russian). He was a member of the Free Kyrgyzstan (Erkin Kyrgyzstan) Democratic Party at that time.

At the beginning of 1993, Tchoroev (Chorotegin) ceased all the political activities (including the party membership) due to his journalism duties and scholarly career.

Journalism, literature, and reporting 
His first ever political pamphlet was published by the monthly satirical and humorous magazine Chalkan (Stinging-Nettle) in October 1974, when he was still a school boy. It was written under influence of the Soviet propaganda machine about the Western world.

Tchoroev (Chorotegin) published several humorous short stories in Kyrgyz in several newspapers, magazines, almanacs and a small book (1974–1986).

He published a lot of reports and publicist articles on cultural and social life of Kyrgyzstanis, people of Central Asia and China in Kyrgyz and Russian languages.

Tchoroev (Chorotegin) translated two books from English into Kyrgyz: The Fatal Conceit: The Errors of Socialism, 1988, by Friedrich August von Hayek, published in Bishkek in 1998 and The Rise of the West: A History of the Human Community: With a Retrospective Essay, 1991, by William Hardy McNeill (its ancient and early medieval ages part), published in Bishkek in 2002. Both translations were published by the Soros-Kyrgyzstan Foundation.

He edited several books in Kyrgyz and Russian, including monographs by a Kyrgyz orientalist Omurkul Kara uulu (Karaev), a Russian archeology professor Yuliy Khudiakov, the Kyrgyz historians Arslan Koichiev, Akylbek Kylychev, Oljobay Karatayev, a lawyer Sabyrbek Kojonaliev, some English-Kyrgyz dictionaries for children, etc.

In 1991 April Tchoroev (Chorotegin) became the second freelancer to work for the Kyrgyz Service of Radio Free Europe/Radio Liberty inside the country.

He was the first chief of the Bishkek Bureau of the Radio Azattyk (the Kyrgyz Service of Radio Free Europe/Radio Liberty) in 1992–1995, 1996–1998).

Tchoroev (Chorotegin) worked as a producer of the BBC Kyrgyz Service (based in London) in April 1998 – July 2000.

He became a broadcaster of the Radio Azattyk (the Kyrgyz Service of Radio Free Europe/Radio Liberty, based in Prague) on 25 July 2000. He was the director of the Service between 1 January 2003 and 30 September 2010.

On 16 August 2011, he ceased his broadcaster's position at the Prague headquarters of the Radio Azattyk.

He is one of the active members of the Kyrgyz-language Wikipedia movement (since 2009).

He was the chairman of the Board of the Muras (Heritage) Foundation under the Office of the President of the Kyrgyz Republic (August 2013 to May 2017.)

Translations of works from foreign languages into Kyrgyz

He translated some books from English and Russian into Kyrgyz. 
One of them, entitled The Fatal Conceit: The Errors of Socialism, 1988, by Friedrich August von Hayek, was translated by T. Chorotegin alone and it was published in Kyrgyz in Bishkek in 1998.
Another monograph entitled The Rise of the West: A History of the Human Community: With a Retrospective Essay, 1991, by William Hardy McNeill (its ancient and early medieval ages part), was translated by him in collaboration with Dr. Arslan Koichiev and Dr. Taalaibek Abdiev. It was published in Kyrgyz in Bishkek in 2002. Both translations were published by the Soros-Kyrgyzstan Foundation. 
He also was amongst the three Kyrgyz translators of the book entitled Deng Xiaoping During the Cultural Revolution by Maomao (Deng Rong). It was translated from its Russian translation into Kyrgyz language and has been published by the Roza Otunbayeva Initiatives International Public Foundation (Bishkek, 2015. - 592 pages, ill. – the Personalities with the Exemplary Life Series. - .) The other translators are Mr. Esenbai Nurushev and Mr. Abibilla Pazylov.  
In November 2015 he has finished the translation of a book entitled An Autobiography or The Story of My Experiments with Truth by Mahatma Gandhi (from English into Kyrgyz). The "Roza Otunbayeva Initiative" International Public Foundation published the book in Kyrgyzstan in the framework of the Personalities with the Exemplary Life Series.

He translated the book Profiles in Courage by John Fitzgerald Kennedy, from English into Kyrgyz language. It was published by the Arcus Publishing House in Bishkek in early 2020, in the framework of the "Roza Otunbayeva Initiative" International Public Foundation's translation projects. The U.S. Embassy to Bishkek was the sponsor of this translation.

He also translated the 6th and 10th volumes of "The Governance of China" series (published in  English translation by Cengage Learning Asia Pte Ltd. – Singapore, 2018.) from English into Kyrgyz language in 2020 and they were published by the Arcus Publishing House in Bishkek at the end of 2020.

Family 

He married Nurgul Dykanalieva (1957-2012), a Kyrgyzstan citizen, on 15 May 1982.

She had graduated the bibliography and librarian branch of the philology faculty at the Kyrgyz women pedagogy university (now - the Kyrgyz State Pedagogy University named after Eshenally Arabay uulu.) A native speaker of Kirghiz, she was also fluent in Kazakh, Russian, English, and Czech. She died in the Bishkek city hospital due to massive stroke on 17 September 2012.

He then married Dr. Aishat Botobekova (now Tchoroeva), a philologist and expert on Kyrgyz people's sign and gesture systems, in Bishkek on 9 November 2013.

He has a son and four daughters.

Awards 

 The Order of "Manas" III degree (31 December 2016.)  
 Laureate of the Tashkent Region's Komsomol (in the field of science; for the cycles of scholarly articles on Makhmud Kashghari); 1989 (Uzbekistan).
 Laureate of the Kyrgyzstan Youth Union (in the field of science; for the monograph on Makhmud Kashghari); 1992 (Kyrgyzstan). 
 Academician of the International Aitmatov Academy. 1994 (Kyrgyzstan). 
 Prize-winner of the Kyrgyzstan Historians' Society; 1995 (Kyrgyzstan).
 The Dank (Glory) medal (2011) (Kyrgyzstan).
 Diploma of the State Language Commission under the Kyrgyz President (2012) (Kyrgyzstan).
 The International Organization of Turkic Culture (TurkSOY) Media awards (2013) (Ankara, Turkey).
 KTRK's Jubilee medal devoted to the 55th anniversary of the Kyrgyzstan TV Broadcasting (2013) (Kyrgyzstan).
 Certificate of Honour of the International Turkic Academy (Astana, Kazakhstan, August 2015).
 Awards by the Valeh Hacilar International Scientific and Cultural Foundation for the 2014 Year (2015) (Erzurum, Turkey).
 The Honorary Citizen of the Naryn region (2015) (Kyrgyzstan). 
 The Honorary Citizen of the city of Naryn (2015) (Kyrgyzstan). 
 The Jubilee medal devoted to the 25th anniversary of the Kyrgyzstan Democratic Movement (2015) (Kyrgyzstan).
 Honorary Professor of 3 universities in Kyrgyzstan (the Kyrgyz State University named after Ishenally Arabayev, Naryn State University named after Satybaldy Naamatov and Talas State University) (2019).

Selected bibliography 
 As a sole author

 Çorotegin, Tınçtıkbek. Mahmud Kaşgari Barskaninin «Divanu lugati t-türk» emgegi türk elderinin tarihi boyunça köönörgüs bulak: İlimiy basılış / Redkollegiya: K.S.Moldokasımov (töraga), j.b.; ilimiy redaktorlor T.Ömürbekov, K.Moldokasımov. – Bişkek: "Turar" basması, 2017. - 376 b., süröt, karta. – "Muras" fondu. ["Tarıh jana muras" türmögü]. - "Kırgız Tarıh Koomu" el aralık koomduk birikmesi. - .  (Chorotegin (Tchoroev), Tynchtykbek. Divanu Lugati t-Türk, the work by Mahmud Kashgari Baskani, as an Inexhaustible Source on the History of the Turkic Peoples / Editorial Board: K.Moldokasymov (Chairman), etc. Edited by Toktorbek Omurbekov and Kyias Moldokasymov. – Bishkek: Turar Printing House, 2017. – 376 pages, ill., map. – The Muras Foundation. – The History and Heritage Series. – The Kyrgyz History Society international public association. – . - In Kyrgyz language.) 
 Historiography of Post-Soviet Kyrgyzstan, in: International Journal for Middle East Studies, 2002, Vol. 34, pp. 351–374 (USA); (2002 Cambridge Un-ty Press 0020-7438/02 )
 The Kyrgyz Republic, in: The Turks (English language edition) / Edited by Hasan Celal Güzel, C. Cem Oguz, and Osman Karatay; Published by Yeni Turkiye Research & Publishing Center. Ankara, 2002. Hard cover, 6 volumes, 6000 pages, . (this chapter is in the 6th vol.).
 Etnicheskiye situatsii v tyurkskikh regionakh Tsentral'noi Azii domongol'skogo vremeni: Po musul'manskim istochnikam IX-XIII vv., edited by Professor Bori Ahmedov. - Bishkek, 1995. – 208 p., ill., map.  (in Russian);
 Makhmud Kashghari (Barskani) jana anyn "Divanu lughati t-turk" söz jyinaghy: (1072–1077), edited by Omurkul Kara-uulu.  Bishkek, 1997. – 160 p., ill., map.  (in Kyrgyz);
 'The Kyrgyz'; in: The History of Civilisations of Central Asia, Vol. 5, Development in contrast: from the sixteenth to the mid-nineteenth century /Editors: Ch. Adle and Irfan Habib. Co-editor: Karl M. Baipakov.  – UNESCO Publishing. Multiple History Series. Paris. 2003. Chapter 4, pp. 109–125. 
 Ocherki istorii kyrgyzov i Kyrgyzstana: (From Ancient Times Until the End of the 18th Century), in: Kyrgyzy: 14-ti tomnik. 11-i tom. Istochniki, istoriya, etnografiya, kul'tura, fol'klor / Sostaviteli Kengesh Jusupov, Kanybek Imanaliev; redaktory Temir Asanovm Ryskul Joldoshov. - Bishkek: Biyiktik Publishing House, 2011. - pp. 157–195.  – . (In Russian.) 
 Kratkiy kurs po izucheniyu arabskoi grafiki sovremennykh kyrgyzov KNR: Uchebnoie posobiye dlya studentov-istorikov / Otv. red. Prof. T.N.Omurbekov. - Bishkek: Kyrgyznatsuniversitet, 2002. - 22 p. – . (In Russian.)
 Chorotegin T. A New Book On Törökul Aitmatov, His Life Journey And His Era: Tarïxtïn Aktay Baraktarï [The Blank Pages Of History]: By Roza Törökulovna Aitmatova. Edited By T. Shaydullaeva And N. Jeenalieva. - Bishkek: Uchkun, 2013. 216 Pages. (In Kyrgyz). Journal of Central and Inner Asian Dialogue. Volume 2, Issue No. 1, Winter 2015. . pp. 78–82.
 The Early Stages of Kyrgyz Ethnicity and Statehood (201 BCE – 10th Century CE); in: International Journal of Eurasian Studies. – Beijing, 2019. – Vol. 9. Special Issue on the Study of Kirghiz History and Culture / Editors-in-Chief Yu Taishan and Li Jinxiu.  p. 33–60.

 Books published in collaboration
 with B.Urstanbekov: Kyrgyz tarykhy: Kyskacha entsiklopediyalyk sözdük, Frunze, Kyrgyz Sovet Entsiklopediyasynyn Bashky redaktsiyasy, 1990. – 288 pages.  (in Kyrgyz);
 with T.Omurbekov: "Tündük Kyrgyzstandyn Orusiiaga karatylyshy (1855–1868)", Bishkek, 1992 (in Kyrgyz);
 with T.Omurbekov: Kyrgyzdardyn jana Kyrgyzstandyn tarykhy: Ezelki zamandan VII k. bashyna cheyin: 6-klass, Bishkek, 1997 (in Kyrgyz); (re-published in new version in 2002. Bishkek.)
 with T.Omurbekov: Kyrgyzdardyn jana Kyrgyzstandyn tarykhy: VII k. bashy - XVIII k. ayaghy: 7-klass, Bishkek, 1998 (in Kyrgyz); (re-published in new version in 2002. – Edited by Oskon Osmonov. Bishkek. 2002.  – 202 pages, ill., map.  )
 with T.Omurbekov: Kyrgyzdardyn jana Kyrgyzstandyn tarykhy: (XIX k. bashy - 1917-jyl): 8-klass, Bishkek, 1998 (in Kyrgyz); (re-published in new version in 2003. – Bishkek.)
 with Omurbekov Toktorbek, Marchenko Larisa. Istoriya Kyrgyzstana: (S drevneishih vremion do nachala IX v. n. e.): Nachal’niy kurs. 6-y klass. / Spets. Redactor Murat Imankulov. Translated from Kyrgyz into Russian by J.Judemisheva and J.Alymkulov. – Bishkek: Pedagogika Printing House. 2001. – 152 pages, ill. Map.
 with Omurbekov Toktorbek. Istoriya Kyrgyzstana: (IX – XVIII vv. ). 7-y klass. / Spets. Redactor Oskon Osmonov. Translated from Kyrgyz into Russian by J.Judemisheva. – Bishkek: Izdatel'skiy tsentr Ministerstva obrazovaniya I kul’tury "Tekhnologiya".  2003. – 184 pages, ill., map.
 with Omurbekov Toktorbek. Istoriya Kyrgyzstana: (XIX v. – 1917 g.). 8-y klass. / Spets. Redactor Oskon Osmonov. Translated from Kyrgyz into Russian by M. Nurtumova. – Bishkek: Izdatel'skiy tsentr Ministerstva obrazovaniya I kul’tury "Tekhnologiya".  2003. – 192 pages, ill.
 with T.Omurbekov: Kyrgyzdardyn jana Kyrgyzstandyn tarykhy: XVII - XX k. bashy, Bishkek, 1995 (in Kyrgyz);
 with K.Moldokasymov: Kyrgyzdardyn jana Kyrgyzstandyn kyskacha taryhy, Bishkek, 2000 (in Kyrgyz);
 with K.Moldokasymov: Istoriya Kyrgyzstana; in: Kyrgyzstan: Entsiklopediya, Bishkek, 2001 (in the separate Kyrgyz and Russian editions);
 with U.A.Asanov, A.Z.Jumanazarova: Kto est' kto v kyrgyzskoi nauke: Bio-bibliograficheskiy spravochnik, Bishkek, 1997 (in Russian);
 with U.A.Asanov, A.Z.Jumanazarova: Kyrgyzskaia nauka v litsah: Kratkiy istoricheskiy I bio- bibliograficheskiy svod / Otv. Red. U.A.Asanov. – Bishkek: Tsentr gosyazyka I entsiklopedii.  2002.  – 544 pages, ill., map.
 with T.Turgunally, K.Asanaliev, M.Kerimbaev: Kyrgyz Jumuriyatynyn Konstitutsiyasynyn dolbooru: Al'ternativdik dolboor. Proyekt Konstitutsii Respubliki Kyrgyzstan: Al'ternativnyi proekt, Bishkek, 1992 ( An Alternative Draft of the Kyrgyz Republic's Constitution; in Kyrgyz and Russian); etc.

References

Sources 

 The Academicians of the Aitmatov Academy / by Dildebek Andashev; edited by Dr. Chetin Jumagulov. - Bishkek: Editorial Board of the Kyrgyz Encyclopaedia, 2011. - p. 96. - In Kyrgyz. - Aitmatov akademiyasynyn akademikteri / Jyinakty tu'zgo'n Dildebek Andashev; jooptuu redaktor Chetin Jumagulov. - Bishkek: Kyrgyz entsiklopediyasynyn bashky redaktsiyasy. - 104 pages, ill. -  .
 The Kyrgyz History: An Encyclopaedia / edited by Abylabek Asankanov. - Bishkek: The Center for State Language and Encyclopaedia, 2003. - p. 421. - in Kyrgyz. - Kyrgyz taryhy: Entsiklopedia / Jooptuu redaktor A. Asankanov. - Bishkek: Mamlekettik til jana entsiklopedia borboru, 2003. - 464 p., ill. – .
 Asanov U.A., Jumanazarova A.Z., Chorotegin T. Kyrgyzskaya nauka v litsakh (The Kyrgyz Science in Faces). - Bishkek, Main Editorial Board of the Kyrgyz Encyclopedy, 2002. p. 499. - 
 Gundula Salk. Die Sanjira Des Togolok Moldo (1860–1942). Wiesbaden. Harrassowitz Verlag. 2009. - S. 2–3. - . 
 Karatayev, Olcobay; Yılmaz, Mehmet Serhat; Yakuboğlu, Cevdet. "Dîvânu Lugâti 't-Türk" Adlı Eserin Tamamlanmasının 940. Yıldönümü: Şarkiyatçı, Tarihçi, Antropolog Prof. Dr. Tınçtıkbek K. Çorotegin’in Araştırmaları (940th Anniversary of the Completion of "Dîvânu Lugâti 't-Türk": Researches of Orientalist, Historian, Anthropologist Prof. Dr. Tınçtıkbek K. Çorotegin) // Alınteri Sosyal Bilimler Dergisi. - Kastamonu Üniversitesi, 2017. - Volume 1 (2). pp. 89–99. - .

External links
http://unesdoc.unesco.org/images/0013/001302/130205e.pdf#135091
https://www.jstor.org/stable/3879832?seq=1
http://cesww.fas.harvard.edu/ces_dis_History.html
http://journals.cambridge.org/action/displayAbstract;jsessionid=30366B46F3E23298E6D72C016D310EAC.tomcat1?fromPage=online&aid=106593
http://www.uygur.org/wunn03/2003_01_25.htm
http://www.turkish-history.com/symposium.asp?id=2
:ky:Чоротегин Тынчтыкбек
Tyntchtykbek Tchoroev, “Chingiz Aitmatov's Lifelong Journey toward Eternity” 
http://www.rferl.org/content/article/1144589.html
https://www.facebook.com/permalink.php?story_fbid=561745805762206&id=106088117994646 
http://www.rferl.org/content/commentary_Saipov_Journalist_Activist_Inspiration/1332659.html
http://www.rferl.org/content/Kyrgyz_Jokes/1974292.html
http://www.rferl.org/content/The_Revolution_In_Kyrgyzstan_Lives_On/1991266.html
http://www.rferl.org/content/off_mic_kyrgyz_may_day_protest/2035589.html
http://www.rferl.org/content/Commentary_Kyrgyzstans_Elections_Offer_Prospect_Of_Real_Change/2183479.html
https://archive.today/20121230114639/http://www.bookworld.com.au/book/kyrgyzstani-writers-tyntchtykbek-tchoroev-iasyr-shivaza-chinghiz-aitmatov/11735595/
https://web.archive.org/web/20140221115528/http://www.turksoy.org.tr/tr/haberler/turksoy_basin_odulleri_ve_mukan_tolebayev_yili_acilisi_gerceklestirildi-29-06-2013.html
http://www.university.kg/index.php?option=com_content&view=article&id=3989%3A-1170-&catid=909%3A---011012&Itemid=1&lang=ru
Scholars and Media Roundtable Cambridge 2011 
 Scopus preview. Historiography of post-Soviet Kyrgyzstan
 Çorotegin, Tınçtıkbek. Part 72. Republic of Kyrgyzstan // The Turks: The Six-Volume Book.  Chief of the Editorial Board Professor Yusuf Halaçoğlu. Edıtors Hasan Celal Güzel, C. Cem Oğuz, Osman Karatay. Ankara: Yeni Türkiye, 2002. – Volume 6. Turkish World.   P. 201–213.  

Kyrgyzstani journalists
Kyrgyzstani historians
Kyrgyzstani public relations people
Living people
1959 births
People from Bishkek
Turkologists
Historians of Central Asia
Democratic Movement of Kyrgyzstan politicians
People from Naryn Region
Kyrgyzstani Sunni Muslims
Kyrgyzstani human rights activists
20th-century Kyrgyzstani writers
21st-century Kyrgyzstani writers
Radio Free Europe/Radio Liberty people
Kyrgyzstani anti-communists
Kyrgyz National University alumni
Academic staff of Kyrgyz National University